Jan van Houwelingen  may refer to:

 Jan van Houwelingen (cyclist) (born 1955), Dutch cyclist
 Jan van Houwelingen (politician) (1939–2013), Dutch politician